Mark Woolf Silverstone (born Marks; December 1880  – 7 September 1951) was a notable Polish-born New Zealand cabinet-maker, socialist, local politician and financier, who co-founded the New Zealand Alliance of Labour.

He was born in Pułtusk, Poland to Jewish parents, Barnett Silverstone, a tailor, and his wife, Esther Gotshank. His parents fled Poland to London in 1889 due to religious persecution.

A socialist, his religious faith declined and he joined the National Secular Society. On 25 June 1904, he wed Esther Ethel Feld, a fellow socialist and émigré.  He became a naturalised citizen of New Zealand in 1907.

Silverstone acted as secretary of the Dunedin branch of the National Peace and Anti-militarist League from 1913, which opposed New Zealand's participation in World War I. However, as a councillor on the Otago Labour Council he sponsored a resolution seeking to safeguard the welfare and interests of demobbed soldiers returning home. In 1936, Silverstone  was appointed to the board of directors of the Reserve Bank of New Zealand by Walter Nash, then-Minister of Finance.

Death
Mark Woolf Silverstone died at Dunedin, New Zealand on 7 September 1951. He was survived by his wife, two sons and two daughters.

Notes

References

1880 births
1951 deaths
New Zealand socialists
People from Pułtusk
New Zealand people of Polish-Jewish descent
Jewish New Zealand politicians
Polish emigrants to New Zealand
20th-century New Zealand politicians
Emigrants from the Russian Empire to New Zealand
New Zealand Socialist Party politicians
Social Democratic Party (New Zealand) politicians
New Zealand Labour Party politicians
Dunedin City Councillors
Date of birth missing